Herman R. Beardsley (July 21, 1800 – March 9, 1878) was a Vermont attorney and judge who served as an associate justice of the Vermont Supreme Court.

Biography
Herman Ruggles Beardsley was born in Kent, Connecticut on July 21, 1800, the son of Ephraim Beardsley and Hannah (Berry) Beardsley.  Ephraim Beradsley's family moved to Grand Isle, Vermont in the early 1800s, and his son was educated by private tutors, including Asa Lyon.  He studied at the University of Vermont, and read law with Bates Turner, Asa Aldis, and John Smith of St. Albans.  Beardsley was admitted to the bar in 1825, and practiced in St. Albans.  In addition to serving in local offices including justice of the peace, in 1834, Beardsley was elected to Vermont's governor's council, and he served until 1835.  In 1837, the University of Vermont awarded him the honorary degree of Master of Arts.  Beardsley represented St. Albans in the Vermont House of Representatives in 1848.

In 1865, Beardsley was appointed to the Vermont Supreme Court, filling the Associate Justice's position left vacant by the resignation of Asa O. Aldis.  He served for only a few months, and was not a candidate for appointment to a full term.  He was succeeded on the court by William C. Wilson.

Family
Beardsley was married to Abigail S. Webb (1808-1874), the stepdaughter of Bates Turner.  They were the parents of three daughters and one son.

Death and burial
Beardsley died in St. Albans on March 9, 1878.  He was buried at Greenwood Cemetery in St. Albans.

References

Sources

1800 births
1878 deaths
People from Kent, Connecticut
People from Grand Isle, Vermont
People from St. Albans, Vermont
U.S. state supreme court judges admitted to the practice of law by reading law
Vermont lawyers
Members of the Vermont House of Representatives
Justices of the Vermont Supreme Court
Burials in Vermont
19th-century American politicians
19th-century American judges
19th-century American lawyers